Chatuchak (or Jatujak) may refer to:

 Chatuchak Weekend Market, Bangkok, Thailand
 Chatuchak Park, a public park just north of Chatuchak Weekend Market
 Chatuchak Park MRT Station, a Bangkok MRT station next to the park
 Chatuchak District, a Bangkok district (khet) named after the park and the market
 Chatuchak, a subdistrict (khwaeng) within Chatuchak District